The 1994 All-Ireland Under-21 Hurling Championship was the 31st staging of the All-Ireland Under-21 Hurling Championship since its establishment by the Gaelic Athletic Association in 1964. The championship began on 28 May 1994 and ended on 11 September 1994.

Galway were the defending champions.

On 11 September 1994, Kilkenny won the championship following a 3-10 to 0-11 defeat of Galway in the All-Ireland final. This was their sixth All-Ireland title overall and their first title since 1990.

Waterford's Paul Flynn was the championship's top scorer with 3-21.

Results

Leinster Under-21 Hurling Championship

Quarter-finals

Semi-finals

Final

Munster Under-21 Hurling Championship

Quarter-finals

Semi-finals

Final

Ulster Under-21 Hurling Championship

Semi-final

Final

All-Ireland Under-21 Hurling Championship

Semi-finals

Final

Championship statistics

Top scorers

Overall

Miscellaneous

 A 68-year-old Galway fan collapsed and died at the All-Ireland final.

References

Under
All-Ireland Under-21 Hurling Championship